Jalen Slawson (born October 22, 1999) is an American college basketball player for the Furman Paladins of the Southern Conference.

Early life and high school
Slawson grew up in Summerville, South Carolina and attended Pinewood Preparatory School. He was named the Area Player of the Year after averaging 14.6 points, 10.5 rebounds, 4.1 blocks, and 3.5 assists per game as a senior. Slawson committed to play college basketball at Furman.

College career
Slawson was a key bench player during his freshman season at Furman and became a starter entering his sophomore year. He averaged 8.7 points as a junior. Slawson was named the Southern Conference (SoCon) Defensive Player of the Year and first-team All-SoCon after averaging 14.4 points, 7.4 rebounds, 3.7 assists, 2.5 steals, and 1.7 blocks per game during his senior season. 

Slawson decided to utilize the extra year of eligibility granted to college athletes who played in the 2020 season due to the coronavirus pandemic and return to Furman for a fifth season.. He was named the SoCon Player of the Year as he helped lead the Paladins' to their first NCAA tournament appearance in 43 years.

Personal life
Slawson's father, Tom Slawson, played college basketball at the Citadel.

References

External links
Furman Paladins bio

Living people
American men's basketball players
Basketball players from South Carolina
Furman Paladins men's basketball players
People from Summerville, South Carolina
Small forwards